Ellis Lake is a lake in geographic Bompas Township, Timiskaming District, in northeastern Ontario, Canada. The lake is in the James Bay drainage basin. The nearest community is Sesekinika,  to the east.

The primary inflow, at the south, is Sarsfield Creek, arriving from Little Sarsfield Lake. The primary outflow, at the north, is also Sarsfield Creek, which heads north to the adjacent Gould Lake. Sarsfield Creek flows via Meyers Lake, Woollings Creek, the Whiteclay River, the Black River, the Abitibi River and the Moose River to James Bay.

See also
List of lakes in Ontario

References

Other map sources:

Lakes of Timiskaming District